Liu Yinghui (born June 29, 1978) is a Chinese hammer thrower.

At the 2004 Summer Olympic she was eliminated in the first round of the hammer throw competition.

Her personal best throw is 72.51 metres, achieved at the 2005 Universiade in Izmir.

Achievements

References

1978 births
Living people
Athletes (track and field) at the 2004 Summer Olympics
Chinese female hammer throwers
Olympic athletes of China
Asian Games medalists in athletics (track and field)
Athletes (track and field) at the 2002 Asian Games
Universiade medalists in athletics (track and field)
Asian Games silver medalists for China
Medalists at the 2002 Asian Games
Universiade gold medalists for China
Universiade silver medalists for China
Competitors at the 2001 Summer Universiade
Medalists at the 2003 Summer Universiade
Medalists at the 2005 Summer Universiade
20th-century Chinese women
21st-century Chinese women